Palpita brevimarginata is a moth in the family Crambidae. It was described by Anthonie Johannes Theodorus Janse in 1924. It is found in Seram, Indonesia.

References

Moths described in 1924
Palpita
Moths of Indonesia